Simon Sunatori (born January 10, 1959) is a Canadian engineer, inventor and entrepreneur, known for the invention of the Multi-Lingual Knowledge Matrix Method and System, the HyperFeeder (a squirrel-proof bird feeder with concentric perching rings and a transparent globe), the MagneScribe (an auto-retractable ballpoint pen with an ergonomic cushion), the Magic Spicer (a self-sealing auto-aligning magnetically hanging spice dispenser with a continuously variable hole-size selector) and Hyper-biOObi (Integrated Multi-Dimensional Biography & Obituary Generator from a Single Source), and for the discovery of the Anisotropic Electromagnetic Force Phenomena.  He obtained a Master of Engineering (Engineering Physics) degree from McMaster University in Hamilton, Ontario, Canada in 1983, and is a member of the Professional Engineers Ontario (PEO), a senior member of the Institute of Electrical and Electronics Engineers (IEEE) and a life member of the World Future Society (WFS).  He is listed in Canadian Who's Who, published by the University of Toronto Press (UTP).

Engineer 
Sunatori worked at Northern Telecom Electronics Ltd. and Bell-Northern Research Ltd. (now Nortel Networks) for 11 years as a member of the scientific staff.  He acted as senior integrated circuit designer for the CMOS standard cell library, as senior design system integrator for the GaAs cell library, and as UNIX systems administrator.  His publications include those in the Journal of Applied Physics.

Inventor 
As an independent inventor, Sunatori has drafted and filed more than 60 solo patent applications in many fields, including electronics, magnetics, optics, dynamics, software, hardware, energy, safety, environment, medical, consumer products, sporting goods, fashion, etc. with titles such as "Topless Microwave Cooking Device", "Unisex Magnetic Coaxial Connector Device", "Magnetically Erected Wind-Effect Display Device", "Erectable Hexa-Conical Beverage Container", "3-Way Hockey Rink", "Drip-free Interconnect with Unisex Magnetic Connector", "Coreless Frozen Pizza" and "Bisexual Magnetic Garment Closure System".  He submitted inventions to the U.S. Department of Defense for Combating Terrorism Technology Research, i.e., "Crash Survivor" and "Germ Buster", to NASA Create the Future Design Contest, etc.  In 2017, he won the Grand Prize of Innovation150 Canadian Life Hacks Contest, organized by the Perimeter Institute for Theoretical Physics.  In 2019, NASA Tech Briefs published his discovery "Anisotropic Electromagnetic Force Phenomena" in The Create the Future Design Contest.

Entrepreneur 
As an entrepreneur, Sunatori founded HyperInfo Canada Inc. in 1989 to pursue research and development on information processing and publishing technology as well as electromagnetic technology applications.  In 1992, he proposed to the Queen of Canada telepresence appearance instead of physical visits.  In 1995, he set up HyperInfo Knowledge Power Centre on the internet to offer pay-for-value knowledge services via e-commerce.  The HyperInfo Knowledge Power Centre won the 1996 Canadian Internet Special Achievement Award for "Best Internet Publication (electronic)", and 1999 Golden Web Award.  In 2002, his court case with the Commission de protection de la langue française (CPLF) was mentioned in The Globe and Mail newspaper, University of Alberta's Alberta Law Review, etc.  In 2005, his MagneScribe invention was featured in the Ottawa Business Journal newspaper.  In 2008, he appeared in PEO's publication "YOU FIND ENGINEERING IN THE MOST AMAZING PLACES" along with Leonid Brezhnev, Jimmy Carter, Leonardo da Vinci, Thomas Edison, Lee Iacocca, Boris Yeltsin, etc.  In 2009, he discovered a serious security breach in Canada Post Ombudsman's online complaints system, as reported in the Ottawa Citizen newspaper.

Patents

Personal life
Sunatori's son François (1989) is a chemical engineer/computer scientist who coined "Cappelletti code".  Sunatori's daughter Véronique (1991) is a professional artist who is a member of XVK.  Sunatori's daughter Évelyne (1993) is a Celebrity ALT in Shimabara, Nagasaki.

References

External links
  Biography of Simon Sunatori at HyperInfo Canada Inc.
  Factacular : Simon Sunatori
  Go Simon Sunatori Patents at FreshPatents
  Go Simon Sunatori Patents at PatentGenius
  Go Simon Sunatori Patents at Canadian Intellectual Property Office (CIPO)
  Go Simon Sunatori Patents at United States Patent and Trademark Office (USPTO)
  {Bio:Transformation/Transformation}

1959 births
Living people
Canadian engineers
Canadian inventors
McMaster University alumni
People from Hamilton, Ontario
Senior Members of the IEEE
Nortel employees